Gerald Small (born August 10, 1956 in Washington, NC, died September 27, 2008 in Sacramento, California) was a professional American football player who played cornerback for seven seasons for the Miami Dolphins and Atlanta Falcons.

1956 births
2008 deaths
People from Washington, North Carolina
American football cornerbacks
Miami Dolphins players
Atlanta Falcons players
San Jose State Spartans football players